K.P. Jayasankar is a documentary filmmaker and researcher who lives in Mumbai. He is currently Professor at the School of Media and Cultural Studies, Tata Institute of Social Sciences. Jointly with Anjali Monteiro, he has over thirty-five documentary films and has over 30 national and international awards in film festivals.

Career

Jayasankar was born in Kochi, Kerala, on 28 November. He completed his bachelor's degree in chemistry from Maharaja's College, Kochi in 1973 and a master's degree in German studies from Department of Foreign Languages, Mumbai University, in 1982. He has done his Ph.D. in humanities and social sciences from Indian Institute of Technology-Bombay, in 1991. He joined Tata Institute of Social Sciences in 1986. He married his colleague Anjali Monteiro in 1989 and they have a daughter.

Jayasankar joined the Audio-Visual Unit, Tata Institute of Social Sciences, in 1986, which is now the School of Media and Cultural Studies. He has been a visiting faculty/scholar at several media and design schools and universities, in India and overseas, including University of Heidelberg, University of Technology, Sydney, Lund University, Sweden, Goldsmiths University, London and Lahti Institute of Design, Finland.

Selected publications 
2020 Anjali Monteiro, K.P. Jayasankar and Amit Rai, DigiNaka: Subaltern Politics and Digital Media in Post-Capitalist India, Orient Blackswan.
2018 Faiz Ullah, Anjali Monteiro and K.P. Jayasankar, DiverCity- Independent Documentary as an Alternate Narrative of the City, in Devasundaram, A.E. (ed) Indian Cinema Beyond Bollywood: The New Independent Cinema Revolution, Routledge	
2016  K.P. Jayasankar and Anjali Monteiro, A Fly in The Curry: Independent Documentary in India, Sage, 2016. Won Special Mention 64th National Film Awards#Golden Lotus Award for best book on cinema category.
2012 Anjali Monteiro and K.P. Jayasankar, Resisting Censorship in India, East Asia Forum Quarterly, Vol 4, No. 1.
2010 Anjali Monteiro K.P. Jayasankar, A New Pair of Scissors- the Draft Cinematograph Bill, Economic and Political Weekly, 17 July 2010
2009  K.P. Jayasankar and Anjali Monteiro,  Jai Ho Shanghai: The Invisible Poor in Slumdog Millionaire, in Kaldor, Mary et al. (eds) Global Civil Society Yearbook of the London School of Economics, Sage, London
2005 K.P. Jayasankar and Anjali Monteiro, Censorship ke Peeche Kya Hai, in Nalini Rajan (ed) Practising Journalism, Sage, London
2003 K.P. Jayasankar and Anjali Monteiro, The Plot Thickens – A Cultural Studies Approach to Media Education in India, in Tony Lavender, Birgitte Tufte and Dafna Lemish (eds.) Global Trends in Media Education, Hampton Press.
2001 K.P. Jayasankar and Anjali Monteiro, Documentary and Ethnographic Film, Elsevier Encyclopaedia of Social and Behavioural Sciences, Elsevier.
2000 K.P. Jayasankar and Anjali Monteiro, Between the Normal and the Imaginary – The Spectator-self, the Other and Satellite Television in India, in Hagen, I and Wasko, J.(eds) Consuming Audiences: Production and Reception in Media Research, Hampton Press.
1998 Anjali Monteiro, Official Television and Unofficial Fabrications of the Self: The Spectator as Subject in Nandy, Ashis (ed.), The Secret Politics of  Our Desires, OUP.
1993 K.P. Jayasankar and Anjali Monteiro, The Spectator-Indian – An Exploratory Study of the Reception of News, Cultural Studies 10 (1).

Filmography
(Co-directed with Anjali Monteiro)

Awards and recognition
2013- Jayasankar's film Saacha (The Loom), co-directed with Anjali Monteiro was a part of the installation, Project Space: Word. Sound. Power. Tate Modern, London, as well as at Kochi-Muziris Biennale.
2018 -Around 30 national and international awards to his films include Our Family.
2008- Certificate of Merit and Special Mention of the Jury, at MIFF.
2013- So Heddan So Hoddan won the Basil – Wright Award at RAI International Ethnographic Film Festival in
2019- A Delicate Weave, which received the Jury's commendation, Intangible culture film prize, 16th Royal Anthropological Institute Festival at Bristol, UK.

References

External links

https://indianculturalforum.in/2020/03/17/a-metropolis-of-contradictions-bombay-through-saacha/
https://indianculturalforum.in/2019/10/31/builders-of-your-grand-edifice-the-memories-of-narayan-surve/
https://indianculturalforum.in/authors/bharathy-singaravel-in-conversation-with-anjali-monteiro-and-kp-jayasankar/

Year of birth missing (living people)
Living people
Indian documentary filmmakers